C. M. "Hank" Hancock (born March 3, 1936) was an American politician in the state of Kentucky. He served in the Kentucky House of Representatives from 1974 to 1995. He is a Democrat.

References

1936 births
Living people
Democratic Party members of the Kentucky House of Representatives